Cư Jút is a rural district (huyện) of Đắk Nông province in the Central Highlands region of Vietnam. As of 2003, the district had a population of 86,377. The district covers an area of 719 km². The district capital lies at Ea T'ling.

References

Districts of Đắk Nông province